Calosoma scabrosum is a species of ground beetle in the family Carabidae. It is found in Africa and the Middle East.

References

scabrosum
Beetles described in 1834